Shanghai: Triple-Threat, also known as Shanghai: The Great Wall, is a video game developed and published by Activision. It is part of the Shanghai series.

Gameplay
Shanghai: Triple-Threat is a computer version of Chinese solitaire involving tile matching.

Reception

In Japan, Game Machine listed Shanghai: Triple-Threat on their September 15, 1995 issue as being the eleventh most-successful arcade game of the month. Next Generation reviewed the game, rating it three stars out of five, and stated that "It's very solitary, but incredibly absorbing, and if you've tried it, you are most likely already one hooked gamer."

Reviews
GamePro - Mar, 1995
GamePro - Nov, 1995
All Game Guide - 1998

References

External links

1995 video games
3DO Interactive Multiplayer games
Activision games
Sega Saturn games